The National Oceanic and Atmospheric Administration (abbreviated as NOAA  ) is a scientific and regulatory agency within the United States Department of Commerce that forecasts weather, monitors oceanic and atmospheric conditions, charts the seas, conducts deep sea exploration, and manages fishing and protection of marine mammals and endangered species in the U.S. exclusive economic zone.

Purpose and function

NOAA's specific roles include:
 Supplying Environmental Information Products. NOAA supplies to its customers and partners information pertaining to the state of the oceans and the atmosphere, such as weather warnings and forecasts via the National Weather Service. NOAA's information services extend as well to climate, ecosystems, and commerce.
 Providing Environmental Stewardship Services. NOAA is a steward of U.S. coastal and marine environments. In coordination with federal, state, local, tribal and international authorities, NOAA manages the use of these environments, regulating fisheries and marine sanctuaries as well as protecting threatened and endangered marine species.
 Conducting Applied Scientific Research. NOAA is intended to be a source of accurate and objective scientific information in the four particular areas of national and global importance identified above: ecosystems, climate, weather and water, and commerce and transportation.

NOAA's five fundamental activities are:
 Monitoring and observing Earth systems with instruments and data collection networks.
 Understanding and describing Earth systems through research and analysis of data.
 Assessing and predicting the changes in these systems over time.
 Engaging, advising, and informing the public and partner organizations with relevant information.
 Custodianship of environmental resources.

History 
NOAA traces its history back to multiple agencies, some of which were among the oldest in the federal government:

 United States Coast and Geodetic Survey, formed in 1807.
 Weather Bureau of the United States, formed in 1870.
 Bureau of Commercial Fisheries, formed in 1871 (research fleet-only).
 Coast and Geodetic Survey Corps, formed in 1917.

The most direct predecessor of NOAA was the Environmental Science Services Administration (ESSA), into which several existing scientific agencies such as the United States Coast and Geodetic Survey, the Weather Bureau and the uniformed Corps were absorbed in 1965.

NOAA was established within the Department of Commerce via the Reorganization Plan No. 4 and formed on October 3, 1970, after U.S. President Richard Nixon proposed creating a new agency to serve a national need for "better protection of life and property from natural hazards… for a better understanding of the total environment… [and] for exploration and development leading to the intelligent use of our marine resources". NOAA is a part of the Department of Commerce rather than the Department of Interior because of a feud between President Nixon and his interior secretary, Wally Hickel, over the Nixon Administration's Vietnam War policy. Nixon did not like Hickel's letter urging Nixon to listen to the Vietnam War demonstrators, and thus punished Hickel by not putting NOAA in the Interior Department.

In 2007, NOAA celebrated 200 years of service in its role as successor to the United States Survey of the Coast. 

NOAA was officially formed in 1970 and in 2021 had 11,833 civilian employees. Its research and operations are further supported by 321 uniformed service members who make up the NOAA Commissioned Corps.

Organizational structure

NOAA administrator
Richard (Rick) W. Spinrad is the 11th and current NOAA Administrator. He was nominated by President Biden, and his nomination was confirmed by the US Senate on June 17, 2021, by voice vote. He was sworn in on June 23, 2021.

From February 25, 2019, to January 20, 2021, Neil Jacobs, Assistant Secretary of Commerce for Environmental Observation and Prediction, served as acting Under Secretary of Commerce for Oceans and Atmosphere at the US Department of Commerce and as NOAA's interim administrator. Jacobs succeeded Timothy Gallaudet, who succeeded Benjamin Friedman. The three served in series as NOAA's interim administrator throughout the Trump Administration. In October 2017, Barry Lee Myers, CEO of AccuWeather, was proposed to be the agency's administrator by the Trump Administration. After two years in the nomination process, on November 21, 2019, Myers withdrew his name from consideration due to health concerns.

Proposal to make NOAA an Independent Agency
NOAA was created by an executive order in 1970 and has never been established in law, despite its critical role. The Washington Post reported on January 27, 2023 that Congressman Frank Lucas, the new chair of the House Science, Space and Technology Committee, has released draft legislation to make NOAA an independent agency, rather than as part of the Commerce Department. Lucas' push is in response to Republican leaders who have signaled plans to slash funding for agencies and programs that continue to receive annual appropriations but have not been reauthorized by Congress. “It’s been made quite clear in the Republican conference that my friends don’t want to fund programs that are not properly authorized,” said Lucas. “NOAA is very important, so we need to get it authorized.”

NOAA services
NOAA works toward its mission through six major line offices, the National Environmental Satellite, Data and Information Service (NESDIS), the National Marine Fisheries Service (NMFS), the National Ocean Service (NOS), the National Weather Service (NWS), the Office of Oceanic and Atmospheric Research (OAR) and the Office of Marine & Aviation Operations (OMAO). and in addition more than a dozen staff offices, including the Office of the Federal Coordinator for Meteorology, the NOAA Central Library, the Office of Program Planning and Integration (PPI).

National Weather Service

The National Weather Service (NWS) is tasked with providing "weather, hydrologic and climate forecasts and warnings for the United States, its territories, adjacent waters and ocean areas, for the protection of life and property and the enhancement of the national economy." This is done through a collection of national and regional centers, 13 river forecast centers (RFCs), and more than 120 local weather forecast offices (WFOs). They are charged with issuing weather and river forecasts, advisories, watches, and warnings on a daily basis. They issue more than 734,000 weather and 850,000 river forecasts, and more than 45,000 severe weather warnings annually. NOAA data is also relevant to the issues of climate change and ozone depletion.

The NWS operates NEXRAD, a nationwide network of Doppler weather radars which can detect precipitation and their velocities. Many of their products are broadcast on NOAA Weather Radio, a network of radio transmitters that broadcasts weather forecasts, severe weather statements, watches and warnings 24 hours a day.

National Ocean Service
The National Ocean Service (NOS) focuses on ensuring that ocean and coastal areas are safe, healthy, and productive. NOS scientists, natural resource managers, and specialists serve America by ensuring safe and efficient marine transportation, promoting innovative solutions to protect coastal communities, and conserving marine and coastal places.

The National Ocean Service is composed of eight program offices: the Center for Operational Oceanographic Products and Services, the Office for Coastal Management, the National Centers for Coastal Ocean Science, the Office of Coast Survey, the Office of National Geodetic Survey, the Office of National Marine Sanctuaries the Office of Ocean and Coastal Resource Management and the Office of Response and Restoration.

There are two NOS programs, namely the Mussel Watch Contaminant Monitoring Program and the NOAA Integrated Ocean Observing System (IOOS) and two staff offices, the International Program Office and the Management and Budget Office.

National Environmental Satellite, Data, and Information Service

The National Environmental Satellite, Data, and Information Service (NESDIS) was created by NOAA to operate and manage the US environmental satellite programs, and manage NWS data and those of other government agencies and departments. NESDIS's National Centers for Environmental Information (NCEI) archives data collected by the NOAA, U.S. Navy, U.S. Air Force, the Federal Aviation Administration, and meteorological services around the world and comprises the Center for Weather and Climate (previously NOAA's National Climatic Data Center), National Coastal Data Development Center (NCDDC), National Oceanographic Data Center (NODC), and the National Geophysical Data Center (NGDC)).
 
In 1960, TIROS-1, NASA's first owned and operated geostationary satellite, was launched. Since 1966, NESDIS has managed polar orbiting satellites (POES) and since 1974 it has operated geosynchronous satellites (GOES). In 1979, NOAA's first polar-orbiting environmental satellite was launched. Current operational satellites include NOAA-15, NOAA-18, NOAA-19, GOES 13, GOES 14, GOES 15, Jason-2 and DSCOVR. In 1983, NOAA assumed operational responsibility for Landsat satellite system.

Since May 1998, NESDIS has operated the Defense Meteorological Satellite Program (DMSP) satellites on behalf of the Air Force Weather Agency.

New generations of satellites are developed to succeed the current polar orbiting and geosynchronous satellites, the Joint Polar Satellite System) and GOES-R, which is scheduled for launch in March 2017.

NESDIS runs the Office of Projects, Planning, and Analysis (OPPA) formerly the Office of Systems Development, the Office of Satellite Ground Systems (formerly the Office of Satellite Operations) the Office of Satellite and Project Operations, the Center for Satellite Applications and Research (STAR)], the Joint Polar Satellite System Program Office the GOES-R Program Office, the International & Interagency Affairs Office, the Office of Space Commerce and the Office of System Architecture and Advanced Planning.

National Marine Fisheries Service
The National Marine Fisheries Service (NMFS), also known as NOAA Fisheries, was initiated in 1871 with a primary goal of the research, protection, management, and restoration of commercial and recreational fisheries and their habitat, and protected species. NMFS operates twelve headquarters offices, five regional offices, six fisheries science centers, and more than 20 laboratories throughout the United States and U.S. territories, which are the sites of research and management of marine resources. NMFS also operates the National Oceanic and Atmospheric Administration Fisheries Office of Law Enforcement in Silver Spring, Maryland, which is the primary site of marine resource law enforcement.

Office of Oceanic and Atmospheric Research

NOAA's research, conducted through the Office of Oceanic and Atmospheric Research (OAR), is the driving force behind NOAA environmental products and services that protect life and property and promote economic growth. Research, conducted in OAR laboratories and by extramural programs, focuses on enhancing our understanding of environmental phenomena such as tornadoes, hurricanes, climate variability, solar flares, changes in the ozone, air pollution transport and dispersion, El Niño/La Niña events, fisheries productivity, ocean currents, deep sea thermal vents, and coastal ecosystem health. NOAA research also develops innovative technologies and observing systems.

The NOAA Research network consists of seven internal research laboratories, extramural research at 30 Sea Grant university and research programs, six undersea research centers, a research grants program through the Climate Program Office, and 13 cooperative institutes with academia. Through NOAA and its academic partners, thousands of scientists, engineers, technicians, and graduate students participate in furthering our knowledge of natural phenomena that affect the lives of us all.

The Air Resources Laboratory (ARL) is one of the laboratories in the Office of Oceanic and Atmospheric Research. It studies processes and develops models relating to climate and air quality, including the transport, dispersion, transformation and removal of pollutants from the ambient atmosphere. The emphasis of the ARL's work is on data interpretation, technology development and transfer. The specific goal of ARL research is to improve and eventually to institutionalize prediction of trends, dispersion of air pollutant plumes, air quality, atmospheric deposition, and related variables.

The Atlantic Oceanographic and Meteorological Laboratory (AOML), is part of NOAA's Office of Oceanic and Atmospheric Research, located in Miami, Florida. AOML's research spans hurricanes, coastal ecosystems, oceans, and human health, climate studies, global carbon systems, and ocean observations. AOML's organizational structure consists of an Office of the Director and three scientific research divisions (Physical Oceanography, Ocean Chemistry and Ecosystems, and Hurricane Research). The Office of the Director oversees the Laboratory's scientific programs, as well as its financial, administrative, computer, outreach/education, and facility management services. Research programs are augmented by the Cooperative Institute for Marine and Atmospheric Studies (CIMAS), a joint enterprise with the University of Miami's Rosenstiel School of Marine and Atmospheric Science. CIMAS enables AOML and university scientists to collaborate on research areas of mutual interest and facilitates the participation of students and visiting scientists. AOML is a member of a unique community of marine research and educational institutions located on Virginia Key in Miami, Florida.

In 1977, the Pacific Marine Environmental Laboratory (PMEL) deployed the first successful moored equatorial current meter – the beginning of the Tropical Atmosphere Ocean, TAO, array. In 1984, the Tropical Ocean-Global Atmosphere program (TOGA) program began.

The Arctic Report Card is the Annual update charts of the ongoing impact of changing conditions on the environment and community by NOAA. It was compiled by 81 scientists from 12 nations in the year 2019.

NOAA ships and aircraft Office of Marine and Aviation Operations

The Office of Marine and Aviation Operations is responsible for the fleet of NOAA ships, aircraft, and diving operations. It has the largest research fleet of the Federal government. Its personnel is made up of civilians and the NOAA Commissioned Corps. The office is headed by a NOAA Corps two-star rear admiral, who also commands the Corps.

National Geodetic Survey
The National Geodetic Survey (NGS) is the primary surveying organization in the United States.

National Integrated Drought Information System
The National Integrated Drought Information System is a program within NOAA with an interagency mandate to coordinate and integrate drought research, building upon existing federal, tribal, state, and local partnerships in support of creating a national drought early warning information system.

NOAA Commissioned Officer Corps

The NOAA Commissioned Officer Corps is a uniformed service of men and women who operate NOAA ships and aircraft, and serve in scientific and administrative posts.

Intergovernmental Panel on Climate Change
Since 2001, the organization has hosted the senior staff and recent chair, Susan Solomon, of the Intergovernmental Panel on Climate Change's working group on climate science.

Hurricane Dorian controversy

Hurricane Dorian was an extremely powerful and destructive tropical cyclone that devastated the northwestern Bahamas and caused significant damage to the Southeastern United States and Atlantic Canada in September 2019. By September 1, NOAA had issued a statement saying that the "current forecast path of Dorian does not include Alabama". However, on that date, President Donald Trump tweeted that Alabama, among other states, "will most likely be hit (much) harder than anticipated". Shortly thereafter, the Birmingham, Alabama office of the National Weather Service issued a tweet that appeared to contradict Trump, saying that Alabama "will NOT see any impacts from Dorian" On September 6, NOAA published a statement from an unidentified spokesperson supporting Trump's September 1 claim. The statement also labelled the Birmingham, Alabama branch of the National Weather Service's contradiction of Trump as incorrect. The New York Times reported that the NOAA September 6 statement was prompted by a threat from U.S. Commerce Secretary Wilbur Ross to fire high-level NOAA staff unless they supported then-U.S. president Donald Trump's claim. The Department of Commerce described this report as "false". Meanwhile, The Washington Post reported that NOAA had twice ordered National Weather Service employees not to provide "any opinion" on Hurricane Dorian and to "only stick with official National Hurricane Center forecasts". The first order came after Trump's September 1 comments and the Birmingham, Alabama National Weather Service's contradiction of Trump. The second order came on September 4 after Trump displayed an August 29 map that was altered with a black marker to show that Hurricane Dorian may hit Alabama.

On September 9, speaking at an Alabama National Weather Service (NWS) meeting the Director of the National Weather Service gave a speech supporting Birmingham NWS and said the team "stopped public panic" and "ensured public safety". He said that when Birmingham issued their instructions they were not aware that the calls they were receiving were a result of Trump's tweet. The acting chief scientist and assistant administrator for the ocean and atmospheric research said he is "pursuing the potential violations" of the agency's scientific integrity policy.

Flag

The NOAA flag is a modification of the flag of one of its predecessor organizations, the United States Coast and Geodetic Survey. The Coast and Geodetic Survey's flag, authorized in 1899 and in use until 1970, was blue, with a white circle centered in it and a red triangle centered within the circle. It symbolized the use of triangulation in surveying, and was flown by ships of the Survey.

When NOAA was established in 1970 and the Coast and Geodetic Survey's assets became a part of NOAA, NOAA based its own flag on that of the Coast and Geodetic Survey. The NOAA flag is, in essence, the Coast and Geodetic Survey flag, with the NOAA logo—a circle divided by the silhouette of a seabird into an upper dark blue and a lower light blue section, but with the "NOAA" legend omitted—centered within the red triangle. NOAA ships in commission display the NOAA flag; those with only one mast fly it immediately beneath the ship's commissioning pennant or the personal flag of a civilian official or flag officer if one is aboard the ship, while multi masted vessels fly it at the masthead of the forwardmost mast. NOAA ships fly the same ensign as United States Navy ships but fly the NOAA flag as a distinguishing mark to differentiate themselves from Navy ships.

See also

References

External links

 
 Records of the National Oceanic and Atmospheric Administration in the National Archives (Record Group 370)
 National Oceanic and Atmospheric Administration in the Federal Register
 Operations, Research, and Facilities account on USAspending.gov
 Procurement, Acquisition and Construction account on USAspending.gov

 
Governmental meteorological agencies in North America
Earth sciences organizations
Hydrology organizations
Oceanographic organizations
Climate change policy in the United States
Satellite operators
Scientific organizations based in the United States
United States Department of Commerce agencies
Government agencies established in 1970
Scientific organizations established in 1970
1970 establishments in the United States